The 2004 Louisville Cardinals football team represented the University of Louisville in the 2004 NCAA Division I-A football season. The team, led by Bobby Petrino in his second year at the school, played their home games in Papa John's Cardinal Stadium. They finished 11–1 and were the Conference USA champions with a perfect 8–0 conference record in their last season before leaving to join the Big East Conference. They were invited to and won the Liberty Bowl, defeating Western Athletic Conference champion Boise State 44–40.

Previous season
The Cardinals finished the 2003 season with a 9–4 record, losing to Miami (OH) in the 2003 GMAC Bowl.

Schedule

Coaching staff

Game summaries

at Miami (FL)

Source: ESPN

Liberty Bowl

Source: ESPN

References

Louisville
Louisville Cardinals football seasons
Conference USA football champion seasons
Liberty Bowl champion seasons
Louisville Cardinals football